Carlo Brugnami (30 September 1938 – c. 2 February 2018) was an Italian racing cyclist. He finished in ninth place in the 1961 Giro d'Italia. His death was announced on 2 February 2018. He was 79.

References

External links
 

1938 births
2018 deaths
People from Corciano
Italian male cyclists
Sportspeople from the Province of Perugia
Cyclists from Umbria